The 2006 Legg Mason Tennis Classic was the 37th edition of this men's tennis tournament and was played on outdoor hard courts.  The tournament was part of the International Series of the 2006 ATP Tour. It was held at the William H.G. FitzGerald Tennis Center in Washington, D.C. in the United States from July 31 through August 6, 2006. Eleventh-seeded Arnaud Clément won the singles title.

Finals

Singles

 Arnaud Clément defeated  Andy Murray, 7–6(7–3), 6–2
It was Clément's 2nd title of the year and the 4th of his career.

Doubles

 Bob Bryan /  Mike Bryan defeated  Paul Hanley /  Kevin Ullyett, 6–3, 5–7, [10–3]

References

External links
 Official website
 ATP tournament profile

Legg Mason
Washington Open (tennis)
Legg Mason Tennis Classic
2006 in sports in Washington, D.C.